Andrea Grego (1400 in Peschiera del Garda – 18 January 1485 in Morbegno) was a  Dominican friar and preacher. He is venerated as a saint in the Roman Catholic church.

Biography 
He was a typical life of frate preacher, devoted to evangelization of villages. He appointed at the Convento di Brescia and from there he moved to St. Mark's Square in Florence where he completed his formation as a disciple of Saint Anthony. Mandated in the Valtellina, he worked for 45 years for his ministry, preaching his beliefs. He installed new parishes and created monasteries, consolidated in 1475 the convent of St. Peter Martyr of Morbegno.

He died on 18 January 1485 in Morbegno and was buried at the church of the Dominicans of Morbegno dedicated to SS. Antonio Abate and Martha.

Veneration 
Pope Pius VII on 26 September 1820 confirmed Grego's  veneration. His feast day is on 19 January and in the Roman Martirologio at that date it is remembered:"At Morbegno on the Alps in Lombardy, Blessed Andrea da Peschiera Grego, priest of the Order of Preachers, who for a long time walked all over the region, living soberly among the poor and fraternally conciliating the minds of all.''(Roman martyrology)

After the Napoleonic Wars the relics were solemnly translated into the Chapel of St. Joseph in the Chiesa di San Giovanni Battista (Collegiate of St. John the Baptist of Morbegno).

In 1933 it was created to accommodate the remains of an urn in Baroque style and in the sixties the wax mask that still covers his face.

In the nineties of the twentieth century the Morbegnese Collegiate donated to the parish of San Martino in Peschiera del Garda, the hometown of the saint, a relic of the Blessed in an eighteenth-century relic, now placed in the new church dedicated to the Blessed and built in 1988 in Peschiera.

Another relic remained in the church of St. Martin, while in the sanctuary of the Madonna del Frassino, always in Peschiera, are the rock on which Andrea was sleeping when they quarreled with his brothers for his faith, and a sixteenth-century painting by Paolo Farinati that depicts the Blessed together with Mary, Saint Francis and Saint Sebastian.

Sources 
Blessed Andrea Grego from Peschiera, in Saints, Blessed and Witnesses - Encyclopedia of Saints, santiebeati.it.

1400 births
1485 deaths
15th-century Italian Roman Catholic priests
Italian Dominicans
Italian beatified people
Venerated Catholics
Beatifications by Pope Pius VII